Salina Journal is a daily morning newspaper based in Salina, Kansas, United States.  It is delivered in north-central and north-western Kansas. Circulation is reported at 20,364 in 2019.

History
The Journal was founded in 1871. It was purchased by Hutchinson, Kansas-based Harris Enterprises in 1949. In November 2016, GateHouse Media purchased the Journal and the five other Harris newspapers.

The current publisher is M. Olaf Frandsen.

333 Line
The 333 Line is a feature of Salina Journal's editorial page. People can telephone their comments which are recorded by automation. Some of these comments appear, verbatim, on the paper's editorial page. In 2004 the Salina Public Library conducted a poll  that suggests that the 333 line is a controversial subject for some members of the community.

See also
 List of newspapers in Kansas

References

External links 
 
 Harris Enterprises (archived from 2010)

Newspapers published in Kansas
Salina, Kansas
Publications established in 1871
1871 establishments in Kansas
Gannett publications